Diefenbach Corners is an unincorporated community in the town of Polk, Washington County, Wisconsin, United States.

History
The community was named for Peter J. Diefenbach, who emigrated from Germany in 1853.

Notes

Unincorporated communities in Washington County, Wisconsin
Unincorporated communities in Wisconsin